Anolis desechensis, the Desecheo anole or Heatwole's anole, is a species of lizard in the family Dactyloidae. The species is found on Desecheo Island in Puerto Rico.

References

Anoles
Reptiles described in 1976
Endemic fauna of Puerto Rico
Reptiles of Puerto Rico
Taxa named by Harold F. Heatwole